The Ch'ing-yang event of 1490 (also Ch'ing-yang, Chi-ing-yang or Chíing-yang meteor shower) is a presumed meteor shower or air burst in Qingyang in March or April 1490. The area was at the time part of Shaanxi, but is now in the Gansu province. A 1994 study in the journal Meteoritics tentatively explained this event as a meteor air burst.

Some historical Chinese accounts of the meteor shower recorded many deaths, but the official Ming Dynasty history records the event without mentioning casualties. The casualties are therefore doubted by many researchers in the modern era. In the same year, Asian astronomers coincidentally discovered comet C/1490 Y1, a possible progenitor of the Quadrantid meteor showers.

Meteor shower
At least three surviving Chinese historical records describe a shower of rocks, one stating that "stones fell like rain." Human fatality estimates in these sources range from more than ten thousand people to several tens of thousands of people. The official History of the Ming Dynasty contains a report of the event, and other journal records which describe the event are also generally considered reliable. The official Ming Dynasty history, however, omits the number of casualties, which therefore has been frequently either doubted or discounted by present-day researchers.

Due to the paucity of detailed information and the lack of surviving meteorites or other physical evidence, researchers have been unable to definitively state the exact nature of the dramatic event, even examining the possible occurrence of severe hail. Kevin Yau of NASA's Jet Propulsion Laboratory and his collaborators have noted several similarities of the Ch'ing-yang event to the Tunguska air burst in 1908, which, if it had occurred above a populated area, could have produced many fatalities.

One surviving account records:

One source of Chinese astronomical information of celestial events, the Zhongguo gudai tianxiang jilu zongji (Complete collection of records of celestial phenomena in ancient China) records ten works that discuss the March–April 1490 event, including the official History of the Ming Dynasty. Additionally, there are records of it in local gazettes and histories of the region. The History of Ming work (the 明史, or Míng Shǐ) states only that there was a rain of uncountable stones up to the size of goose eggs. The date given was the third lunar month of 1490, which translates as March 21 to April 19, 1490.

Coincidental comet
In 2007 astronomers determined that the annual January Quadrantid meteor shower may have originated with the disintegration of Comet C/1490 Y1, approximately a century after it was first identified in 1490 by Chinese, Japanese, and Korean astronomers. A connection with asteroid (196256) 2003 EH1 has also been suggested. The large difference between the timing of the January meteor showers and the 1490 Ch'ing-yang event—which occurred in March or April 1490 AD—makes a relationship between the comet and the Ch'ing-yang event appear unlikely.

See also

 Asteroid impact avoidance
 B612 Foundation
 NEOShield
 Spaceguard

References

Further reading
 Crawford, D.; Mader, C.  "Modeling Asteroid Impact Tsunami", Science of Tsunami Hazards, 1998, Vol. 16 pp. 21–30.
 Lewis, John S. Comet And Asteroid Impact Hazards On A Populated Earth: Computer Modeling, Volume 1, Academic Press, 2000, .
 
 Steel, Duncan. Rogue Asteroids and Doomsday Comets: The Search for the Million Megaton Menace That Threatens Life on Earth, Wiley & Sons, 1995, [1997], .
 Ward, S.; Asphaug, E. "Asteroid Impact Tsunami: A Probabilistic Hazard Assessment", Icarus, 2000, Vol. 145, pp. 64–78.

1490 in Asia
15th century in China
Disasters in Gansu
Modern Earth impact events
Meteorite falls
Qingyang
15th century in science
Disasters in Ming dynasty